Catherine Harrison and Sabrina Santamaria defeated Han Xinyun and Yana Sizikova in the final, 1–6, 7–5, [10–6] to win the doubles tennis title at the 2022 Monterrey Open.

Caroline Dolehide and Asia Muhammad were the reigning champions, but they did not participate this year.

Seeds

Draw

Draw

References

External links
Main draw

2022 WTA Tour
2022 Monterrey Open - 2